Tatobotys janapalis is a moth in the family Crambidae. It was described by Francis Walker in 1859. It is found in Japan, Taiwan, Sri Lanka, India, Myanmar, Borneo, Indonesia (Moluccas, Seram) the Solomon Islands. It is also found in Australia, where it has been recorded from Queensland and New South Wales.

The wingspan is about 30 mm. Adults are yellowish brown, with dark markings including zigzag lines on the wings.

References

Moths described in 1859
Spilomelinae